The 2017 Japanese Super Formula Championship was the forty-fifth season of premier Japanese open-wheel motor racing, and the fifth under the moniker of Super Formula. Yuji Kunimoto is the defending series champion.

Hiroaki Ishiura won his second Driver's Championship in three years, finishing only half a point ahead of Pierre Gasly after the final round was cancelled due to Typhoon Lan. The Cerumo INGING team won their second successive Team Championship.

Teams and drivers

Driver changes
Leaving Super Formula
Stoffel Vandoorne will leave the series to compete in Formula One with McLaren.
Bertrand Baguette will leave the series to compete in Super GT Series.
Yuichi Nakayama is replaced at the single car KCMG team by Kamui Kobayashi.
 Joao Paulo de Oliveira, 2010 Formula Nippon champion, leaves after seven seasons with Team Impul and ten in the series.

Entering Super Formula
2016 GP2 Series champion, Red Bull Racing and Scuderia Toro Rosso reserve driver Pierre Gasly moved to Super Formula with Team Mugen. He replaced Daniil Kvyat at Scuderia Toro Rosso from the 2017 Malaysian Grand Prix, but skipped the 2017 United States Grand Prix to finish the Super Formula season.
Nick Cassidy and Kenta Yamashita, the 2015 and 2016 Japanese Formula 3 champions, join the series with Kondo Racing, replacing James Rossiter and William Buller.
GT Academy winner Jann Mardenborough makes his series debut with Team Impul.
2015 European F3 champion Felix Rosenqvist joins the series. He is joined at Team LeMans by Kazuya Oshima, making his full-time return to Super Formula for the first time since 2012.

Race calendar

Championship standings

Drivers' Championship
Scoring system

Driver standings

Teams' Championship

References

External links
Japanese Championship Super Formula official website 

2017
Super Formula
Super Formula